Fernando Ferretti (26 April 1949 – 29 August 2011) was a former Brazilian association football striker who mainly played for Botafogo.

Olympic career
Ferretti featured in all three matches of the Brazilian (under-23) Olympic football team of Brazil at the 1968 Olympic Games, and became the Brazilian top scorer with two goals. In the 55th minute of the last group match against Nigeria, he was sent off.

References

1949 births
2011 deaths
Footballers from Rio de Janeiro (city)
Brazilian footballers
Brazil international footballers
Association football forwards
Footballers at the 1968 Summer Olympics
Botafogo de Futebol e Regatas players
Santos FC players
CR Vasco da Gama players
Fluminense FC players
Esporte Clube Vitória players
Ceará Sporting Club players
Atlético Clube Goianiense players
Olympic footballers of Brazil